George Washington's World is a children's history book by Genevieve Foster. The first edition, illustrated by the author, was published in 1941 and was a Newbery Honor recipient in 1942.

References

1941 children's books
Children's history books
American children's books
Newbery Honor-winning works
Charles Scribner's Sons books
Books about George Washington